Justin J. Cassel (born September 25, 1984) is an American professional baseball pitcher who is currently a free agent. Prior to beginning his professional career, he played college baseball at the University of California, Irvine. Cassel has also competed for the United States national baseball team.

Career
Cassel attended Chatsworth High School, where he set single season records in wins, strikeouts and shutouts. Cassel was named First Team High School All-American. He was drafted by the Oakland Athletics in the 30th round (902nd overall) of the 2003 Major League Baseball draft, but he did not sign. He went to college at University of California, Irvine, where he played college baseball for the UC Irvine Anteaters baseball team in the Big West Conference of the National Collegiate Athletic Association's (NCAA) Division I. In 2004, he played collegiate summer baseball with the Chatham A's of the Cape Cod Baseball League.

Cassel was then selected by White Sox in seventh round (225th overall) of 2006 Major League Baseball draft. He made his professional debut in 2006 with the Great Falls White Sox of the Rookie-level Pioneer League, receiving a promotion to the Winston-Salem Warthogs of the Class-A Advanced Carolina League. In 2007, Cassel pitched for the Bristol White Sox of the Rookie-level Appalachian League and Winston-Salem. In 2008, playing for the Class-AA Birmingham Barons, Cassel was named to the Southern League All-Star team. He pitched for Birmingham and the Charlotte Knights of the Class-AAA International League in 2009 and 2010. In 2011, he made a total of nine appearances for Bristol, Winston-Salem, and Charlotte. He pitched in the Venezuelan Winter League after the 2011 season.

Cassel played for the United States national baseball team in the 2011 Baseball World Cup and the 2011 Pan American Games, winning the silver medal.

Personal
Cassel's brother, Jack, has played in Major League Baseball, while his brother Matt was a quarterback in the National Football League.

References

External links

1984 births
Living people
Baseball players at the 2011 Pan American Games
Baseball players from Los Angeles
Baseball pitchers
Birmingham Barons players
Bristol White Sox players
Charlotte Knights players
Chatham Anglers players
Great Falls White Sox players
Pan American Games silver medalists for the United States
Pan American Games medalists in baseball
Somerset Patriots players
UC Irvine Anteaters baseball players
United States national baseball team players
Winston-Salem Dash players
Winston-Salem Warthogs players
Medalists at the 2011 Pan American Games